Nelamangala Assembly constituency is one of the 224 constituencies in the Karnataka Legislative Assembly of Karnataka a south state of India. It is also part of Chikballapur Lok Sabha constituency.

Members of Legislative Assembly

Mysore State
 1951 (Seat-1): D. M. Govindaraju, Indian National Congress
 1951 (Seat-2): K. Prabhakar, Indian National Congress

 1957 (Seat-1): Alur Hanumanthappa, Indian National Congress
 1957 (Seat-2): Lokesvaniratha M. Hanumanthaiah, Indian National Congress

 1962: K. Prabhakar, Indian National Congress

 1967: Alur Hanumanthappa, Indian National Congress

 1972: M. Mare Gowda, Independent

Karnataka State
 1978: K. Prabhakar, Indian National Congress (Indira)

 1983: M. G. Sathyanarayana, Janata Party

 1985. S Thygaraja Gupta   Janata Party

 1989: Anjana Murthy, Indian National Congress

 1994: M. Shankar Naik, Janata Dal

 1999: Anjana Murthy, Indian National Congress

 2004: Anjana Murthy, Indian National Congress

 2008: M. V. Nagaraju, Bharatiya Janata Party

 2013: K. Srinivasamurthy, Janata Dal (Secular)

 2018: K. Srinivasamurthy, Janata Dal (Secular)

See also
 Bangalore Rural district
 List of constituencies of Karnataka Legislative Assembly

References

Assembly constituencies of Karnataka
Bangalore Rural district